Thrissobrycon pectinifer is a species of characin endemic to Brazil.  It is the sole member of its genus.

References
 

Characidae
Monotypic fish genera
Fish of South America
Fish of Brazil
Endemic fauna of Brazil
Taxa named by James Erwin Böhlke
Fish described in 1953